Laufey Ólafsdóttir is an Icelandic football midfielder who plays in the Úrvalsdeild kvenna for Valur, with whom she has also played the Champions League. She was named Icelandic Player of the Year in 2004 and 2005.

She has been a member of the Icelandic national team.

References

1981 births
Living people
Laufey Olafsdottir
Laufey Olafsdottir
Laufey Olafsdottir
Women's association football midfielders
Laufey Olafsdottir
Laufey Olafsdottir